Godlike Snake is the first album by the Italian experimental metal band Ufomammut, released in 2000 by Beard Of Stars label.

Track listing

References

2000 albums
Ufomammut albums